Remission is a 1984 EP by Canadian electro-industrial band Skinny Puppy, their record label debut and first release with Nettwerk. The 12-inch EP originally featured six tracks, then, a year later in 1985, it was released on cassette with five additional songs that lengthened the release to a full album. This expansion became the default version of Remission.

Remission was certified gold by Music Canada on January 31, 2000.

Release history

In December 1984, Remission was distributed through Nettwerk as Skinny Puppy's first major release. Despite being preceded by the embryonic Back & Forth EP that was limited to just 35 home-printed copies, Remission is seen as the band's debut effort. To complicate the matter further, most issues of the EP following its release year, 1984, were expanded with five additional tracks, retroactively turning it into a full-blown studio album.

In 1993, Nettwerk released Remission on CD using the expanded track listing from the 1985 cassette release. However, this wasn't the first time Remission appeared in the format; the EP's first CD release was in 1987, when it (along with the appended track "Glass Out") was combined with Skinny Puppy's 1985 album Bites to form the release Bites and Remission (a compilation distinct from the less popular Remission & Bites, which was also released in 1987 and also on Nettwerk, but that preserved the original track sequence of Remission and the European sequence of Bites).

On May 17, 2018, cEvin Key released "Coma", an instrumental track created during the Remission era, through his YouTube channel.

Background and composition
Both Remission and Skinny Puppy's follow-up album Bites were created before Dwayne Goettel joined in 1986 and helped crystallize the band's hard, percussion-driven industrial sound. As such, Remission features more synthpop and electro elements than Skinny Puppy would come to be known for. It is the first known commercial release to use a TR-909 drum machine.

In 2013, Skinny Puppy's 12th album (4th since being reunited without the presence of Goettel), Weapon, was released as a sort of spiritual successor to both Remission and Bites. Apart from containing a re-recorded version of "Solvent" from Remission, Weapon was deliberately created with antiquated instruments to achieve their early 1980s-style electronic sound.

Critical reception

Contemporary reception of Remission was mostly positive. The AllMusic review wrote that the EP "remains the Puppy's finest hour. The breadth of vision and amazing instrumental prowess of vocalist Nivek Ogre and sound-designer cEvin Key will likely never be transcended." Retrospectively, Remission gained more praise, being cited as an important influence to many bands. In an article about Skinny Puppy's broad influence, Alec Chillingworth of Metal Hammer wrote, "Al Jourgensen’s Ministry was laughable in ’84, whereas Puppy gave us Remission: an EP bursting with potential, exuding a dance-ready racket heavier than anything their contemporaries offered." Fact placed Remission at number 19 on their list of 20 best industrial and EBM albums of all time, calling it "excellent electro-pop".

Track listing

Personnel
All credits adapted from Remission liner notes.

Skinny Puppy
 Nivek Ogre – vocals, keyboards, synthesizer, percussion, spooky horn
 cEvin Key – synthesizer, drums, percussion, tapes, vocals, treatments, production
Additional personnel
 Dave Ogilvie – production, engineering
 Bill Leeb (credited as Wilhelm Schroeder) – bass synth on "Incision", "Manwhole", and "Ice Breaker"
 D. Plevin – fretless bass on "Glass Houses"
 Steven R. Gilmore – cover art
 Greg Sykes – typography

Certifications

References

1984 EPs
Skinny Puppy EPs
Nettwerk Records EPs
PIAS Recordings EPs